Nchawaka Saili  (born 2 July 1996) is a Zambian footballer who plays as a forward for the Zambia women's national football team. She was part of the team at the 2014 African Women's Championship. On club level she played for Bauleni Sports Academy in Zambia.

References

External links
 CAF player profile

1996 births
Living people
Zambian women's footballers
Zambia women's international footballers
Place of birth missing (living people)
Women's association football forwards